Statistics of Swiss Super League in the 1984–85 season.

Overview
It was contested by 16 teams, and Servette FC Genève won the championship.

League standings

Results

Sources
 Switzerland 1984–85 at RSSSF

Swiss Football League seasons
Swiss
1984–85 in Swiss football